Robert Frederick Potts, known as Fred Potts (born 1893) was an English professional footballer who played as a right back.

Career
Born in Congleton, Potts played for Bacup Borough, Bradford City and Congleton Town. For Bradford City, he made 136 appearances in the Football League; he also made 11 FA Cup appearances.

Sources

References

1893 births
People from Congleton
Year of death missing
English footballers
Bacup Borough F.C. players
Bradford City A.F.C. players
Congleton Town F.C. players
English Football League players
Association football defenders